The East End of London is the historic core of wider East London.

East End or Eastend may also refer to:

Places

Australia 
 East End, Adelaide
 East End, Queensland
 East End Theatre District, Melbourne

Canada 
 Eastend, Saskatchewan
 East End of Rundle, a mountain in Alberta

New Zealand 
 East End, New Zealand

Norway 
 East End and West End of Oslo

Sierra Leone 
 East End of Freetown

United Kingdom
 England
 East End, Buckinghamshire
 East End, Hampshire
 East End, Suffolk
 East End, Oxfordshire, in North Leigh civil parish
 Lower Don Valley, also known as the East End of Sheffield

 Scotland
 East End, Glasgow

 Overseas Territories
 East End, Anguilla
 East End, Cayman Islands

United States
 East End, Arkansas
 East End (Arizona), a mountain in the McDowell Mountains
 East End (Waterbury), Connecticut
 East End (Long Island), Suffolk County, New York
 East End, Cincinnati, Ohio
 East End (Pittsburgh), Pennsylvania 
 East End, Houston, Texas
 East End, Virginia, in Westmoreland County
 East End (Newport News, Virginia)
 East End (Richmond, Virginia)
 East End, Saint Croix, U.S. Virgin Islands
 East End, Saint John, U.S. Virgin Islands
 East End, Saint Thomas, U.S. Virgin Islands

Other uses
 The east end of a cathedral

See also
 East Side (disambiguation) 
 East End Bridge (disambiguation)
 East End Historic District (disambiguation)
 East End Park (disambiguation)
 EastEnders, British soap opera set in the East End of London